oland competed at the 1972 Summer Olympics in Munich, West Germany. 290 competitors, 252 men and 38 women, took part in 150 events in 22 sports.

Medalists

Gold
 Wladyslaw Komar - Athletics, Men's Shot Put 
 Jan Szczepański - Boxing, Men's Flyweight
 Witold Woyda - Fencing, Men's Foil Individual
 Marek Dąbrowski, Jerzy Kaczmarek, Lech Koziejowski, Witold Woyda, and Arkadiusz Godel - Fencing, Men's Foil Team
 Anczok, Ćmikiewicz, Deyna, Gadocha, Gorgoń, Gut, Jarosik, Kmiecik, Kostka, Kraska, Lato, Lubański, Marx, Maszczyk, Ostafiński, Szeja, Szołtysik, Szymanowski, and Szymczak - Football, Men's Team Competition
 Józef Zapędzki - Shooting, 25m Rapid Fire Pistol (60 shots)
 Zygmunt Smalcerz - Weightlifting, Men's Flyweight

Silver
 Irena Szydłowska - Archery, Women's Individual Competition
 Wiesław Rudkowski - Boxing, Men's Light Middleweight
 Lucjan Lis, Edward Barcik, Stanisław Szozda, and Ryszard Szurkowski　- Cycling, Men's Road Team Time Trial
 Antoni Zajkowski - Judo, Men's Half-Middleweight
 Norbert Ozimek - Weightlifting, Men's Light-Heavyweight

Bronze
 Irena Szewińska - Athletics, Women's 200m
 Ryszard Katus - Athletics, Men's Decathlon
 Leszek Błażyński - Boxing, Men's Flyweight
 Janusz Gortat - Boxing, Men's Light Heavyweight 
 Władysław Szuszkiewicz and Rafal Maciej Piszcz - Canoe, Men's Kayak Flatwater K-2 1.000m
 Andrzej Bek, and Benedykt Kocot - Cycling Track, Men's 2.000m Tandem
 Zbigniew Kaczmarek - Weightlifting, Men's Lightweight
 Kazimierz Lipień - Wrestling Greco-Roman, Men's Featherweight
 Czesław Kwieciński - Wrestling Greco-Roman, Men's Light-Heavyweight

Archery

In the first modern archery competition at the Olympics, Poland entered one man and three women. They took home a silver medal in the women's competition.

Men

Women

Athletics

Men
Track & road events

Field events

Combined events – Decathlon

Women
Track & road events

Field events

Basketball

Preliminary round

Group B

Classification brackets
9th–12th place

Team roster
 - 10th place

 Ryszard Bialowas
 Janusz Ceglinski
 Eugeniusz Durejko
 Jan Dolczewski

 Andrzej Kasprzak
 Grzegorz Korcz
 Waldemar Kozak
 Piotr Langosz

 Mieczyslaw Łopatka
 Franciszek Niemiec
 Andrzej Pasiorowski
 Andrzej Seweryn

Head coach

Boxing

Men

Canoeing

Slalom

Sprint
Men

Women

Cycling

Twelve cyclists represented Poland in 1972.

Road

Track
1000m time trial

Men's Sprint

Pursuit

Men's Tandem

Diving

Men

Women

Equestrian

Eventing

Show jumping

Fencing

20 fencers, 15 men and 5 women, represented Poland in 1972.

Men

Women

Football

First round

Group D

Second round

Group 2

Gold medal match

Gold medal

 Zygmunt Anczok
 Lesław Ćmikiewicz
 Kazimierz Deyna
 Robert Gadocha
 Jerzy Gorgoń
 Zbigniew Gut

 Andrzej Jarosik
 Kazimierz Kmiecik
 Hubert Kostka
 Jerzy Kraska
 Grzegorz Lato
 Włodzimierz Lubański

 Joachim Marx
 Zygmunt Maszczyk
 Marian Ostafiński
 Marian Szeja 
 Zygfryd Szołtysik
 Antoni Szymanowski
 Ryszard Szymczak

Head coach
 Kazimierz Górski

Gymnastics

Artistic
Men

Individual finals

	
Women

Handball

Poland tied Sweden and defeated Denmark but lost to the Soviet Union in the first round to finish in third place in the division. This put the team into the ninth- to twelfth-place consolation round, where they defeated Iceland to set up a match with Norway for ninth and tenth places. Poland lost this match.

Preliminary round

Group A

 Sweden tied Poland, 13-13
 Poland def. Denmark, 11-8
 Soviet Union def. Poland, 17-11

Classification 9-12
 Poland def. Iceland, 20-17
 Norway def. Japan, 19-17

Classification 9/10
 Norway def. Poland, 23-20

10th place

 Zdzisław Antczak
 Zbigniew Dybol
 Franciszek Gąsior
 Jan Gmyrek
 Bogdan Kowalczyk
 Zygfryd Kuchta

 Andrzej Lech
 Jerzy Melcer
 Helmut Pniocinski
 Wladyslaw Popielarski
 Hendryk Rozmiarek

 Andrzej Sokołowski
 Engelbert Szolc
 Andrzej Szymczak
 Wlodzimierz Wachowicz
 Robert Zawada

Head coach
 Janusz Czerwiński

Hockey

Men's team competition

Preliminary round

Group B

August 27, 1972
 Kenya – Poland 0-1 (0-1)
August 28, 1972
 Netherlands – Poland 4-2 (3-0)
August 30, 1972
 Poland – Mexico 3-0 (1-0)
August 31, 1972
 India – Poland 2-2 (1-0)
September 2, 1972
 New Zealand – Poland 3-3 (1-2)
September 3, 1972
 Australia – Poland 1-0 (1-0)
September 4, 1972
 Poland – Great Britain 1-2 (1-1)

Men's Classification Matches
September 8, 1972
 11th/12th place: France – Poland 4-7 (2-1) after extra time

12th place

 Jerzy Choroba
 Aleksander Ciazynski
 Boleslaw Czainski
 Jerzy Czajka
 Henryk Grotowski
 Stanisław Iskrzynski

 Zbigniew Juszczak
 Stanisław Kasprzyk
 Stanisław Kazmierczak
 Marek Krus
 Zbigniew Loj
 Wlodzimierz Matuszynski

 Stefan Otulakowski
 Ryszard Twardowski
 Stanisław Wegnerski
 Aleksander Wrona
 Józef Wybieralski
 Witold Ziaja

Head coach

Judo

Men

Modern pentathlon

Three male pentathletes represented Poland in 1972.

Alternate Member: 
 Krzysztof Trybusiewicz

Rowing

Men

Sailing

Open

Shooting

Thirteen shooters, 12 men and one woman, represented Poland in 1972. Józef Zapędzki won gold in the 25 m rapid fire pistol.

Open

Swimming

Men

Volleyball

Preliminary round

Pool A

|}

|}

9th–10th places

9th place match

|}

Weightlifting

Men

Wrestling

Men's freestyle

Men's Greco-Roman

References

Nations at the 1972 Summer Olympics
1972 Summer Olympics
1972 in Polish sport